Andrew Deeks (born in 1963) is an Australian academic administrator who became the ninth President of University College, Dublin (UCD), in 2014. He is the first Australian and second non-Irish person to hold the presidency after co-founder John Henry Newman. Deeks was previously Pro-Vice Chancellor of Durham University before replacing Hugh Brady as President of UCD. He will become Vice-Chancellor of Murdoch University in April 2022.

Background 
Born in England in 1963, his family migrated to Perth, Western Australia, when he was six years old. Deeks holds a bachelor's degree in civil engineering from the University of Western Australia (UWA). In 1984, after he completed his masters, he worked in industry, later returning to the University of Western Australia for a PhD degree. His research works focus on structural dynamics, mechanics and dynamic soil structure, with more than 150 published papers to his name. He became Winthrop professor in civil and resources engineering in 2004. From 2004 to 2009, he was head of school at UWA, before joining Durham University as Pro-Vice-Chancellor in science, being among the Institute of Advanced Research Computing in the university. Deeks became President of University College, Dublin, in January 2014, and will leave the position in April 2022.

His membership positions:

 Executive Committee of the Universitas – A 21-university network
 Administrative Board of the International Association of Universities
 European Universities Association and the Irish Universities Association
 Fellow of the Irish Academy of Engineering
 Institution of Engineers Ireland and the Institution of Engineers Australia.

References 

1963 births
Australian civil engineers
Academics of Durham University
Academic staff of the University of Western Australia
Living people
Presidents of University College Dublin